The Victoria barb (Enteromius viktorianus) is a species of ray-finned fish in the  family Cyprinidae.
It is found only in Kenya.
Its natural habitat is rivers. Its status is insufficiently known.

References  

Enteromius
Cyprinid fish of Africa
Enteromius viktorianus
Fish described in 1929
Taxonomy articles created by Polbot